Lex Glyndwr XI F.C. are a Welsh football team based in Wrexham, currently playing in the North East Wales Football League Premier Division.

History

They play in the Welsh National League Division One, which is in the Fourth level of the Welsh football league system.

Lex XI 1st team are currently playing in Division 1,and the Lex XI reserves are currently playing in the Reserves & Colts Football League.

Lex has hosted numerous great games at Stansty Park over the years and in the Summer of 2014 hosted a fundraising game between themselves and a Wrexham FC legends XI which include big names such as Karl Connolly, Dixie McNeil and Steve Watkin. Lex also hosted the 2013 North East Wales Football Association under 16's cup final, which saw Borras Park Albion YFC beat Shotton Steel YFC 4–3 on penalties in front of a 200 strong crowd.

The club withdrew from the Welsh National League  in February 2019 after being unable to field a team.  They rejoined later that year for the 2019–20 season as a Division One club.

The club joined the newly formed North East Wales Football League in 2020 as a Premier Division club.

Honours

 Welsh National League Premier Division: 1984–85, 1987–88, 1988–89
 Cymru Alliance: 18th 1990–91, 1999–2000, 2003–04
 North East Wales FA Challenge Cup Winners (3): 1988–89, 1990–91, 2008–09
 North East Wales FA Challenge Cup Runners-up (7): 1981–82, 1982–83, 1984–85, 1994–95, 1995–96, 1998–99, 2000–01

References

External links

Football clubs in Wrexham
Football clubs in Wales
1975 establishments in Wales
Cymru Alliance clubs
Welsh National League (Wrexham Area) Premier Division clubs
Association football clubs established in 1975
North East Wales Football League clubs